Colotis amata, the small salmon Arab, is a small butterfly of the family Pieridae, that is, the yellows and whites. It is found in Africa and Asia.

Description

Male upperside has a salmon-pink ground colour. The costa on the forewing is black and thickly overlaid with greyish or pinkish scales; a black spot at apex of cell, which may be large and quadrate or smaller and lunate; termen broadly black, with an enclosed double transverse series of spots of the ground colour the inner series consists of a large spot in interspace 1, two very small spots in interspaces 2 and 3, one in each, and four larger anterior spots placed in a curve; the spots in the outer series are variable in number, but generally there is one in each interspace, these are more or less linear in shape. Hindwing: a band on costal margin extended to just within the upper margin of the cell, covered with dense black specialized scales; this black band joined onto a broad similarly-coloured terminal band of ordinary scales, that becomes more or less diffuse and powdery posteriorly, and encloses a double series of small spots of the ground colour the inner series often obsolescent, in some specimens entirely absent; dorsum heavily irrorated with fuscous scales, the irroration extended onto the disc, which has therefore generally a greyish appearance.

Underside: greenish yellow; an anteciliary fine black line on both forewing and hindwings; the black markings of the upperside show through by transparency. Forewing: a black spot, variable in size and intensity, in some specimens absent altogether, at apex of cell; a subterminal quadrate black spot in interspace 1 and another (sometimes faintly marked or absent) further outwards in interspace 2; disc faintly, dorsal margin broadly very pale salmon pink. Hindwing: the whole surface sparsely irrorated with minute black scales; a small black discocellular spot. Cilia of both forewings and hindwings pale salmon pink. Antennae, head, thorax and abdomen black, the antennae speckled with white, the head and thorax covered with greenish-fuscous hairs; beneath: the palpi green, thorax and abdomen white.
Female is polymorphic.
Form 1. Upperside: ground colour paler than in the male, in some specimens quite ochraceous outwardly; all the markings similar, but duller in tint. The hindwing, of course, without the black costal band of specialized scales, the ground colour extended up to the costal margin. Underside similar to that of the male, but the ground colour very much paler and more ochraceous than green. In some specimens, in addition to the black spots in interspaces 1 and 2 on forewing, there is an anterior postdiscal fuscous curved band. Hindwing: discocellular spot larger than in the 3 and annular; a curved discal series of reddish spots from costa to dorsum.
Form 2. Similar to female form 1, but the ground colour pale primrose yellow to pure white. Antennae, head, thorax and abdomen in both forms much as in the male.

Life history

Larva: "Very like that of Eurema, cylindrical or slightly depressed with a rough surface due to minute tubercles, from each of which grows a very small bristle. The colour is a uniform grass-green, with a blue dorsal line more or less distinct, and a yellowish lateral line dividing the colour of the back from the paler green of the underparts." (Davidson & Aitken quoted in Bingham)

Pupa: "Compressed; wing-cases produced into a keel like that of Eurema. It is suspended in the same manner by the tail and a moderately long band. The colour is usually some shade of dingy whitish brown or dirty green." (Davidson & Aitken quoted in Bingham)

Subspecies
C. a. amata (western, southern and central India Africa)
C. a. calais (Cramer, 1775) (Mauritania, northern Senegal, Gambia, Mali, north-eastern Nigeria, Niger, Zambia, northern Botswana, Zimbabwe, Mozambique, Eswatini, South Africa, southern Arabia)
C. a. crowleyi (Sharpe, 1898) (Madagascar)
C. a. modesta (Butler, 1876) (Sri Lanka)
C. a. williami Henning & Henning, 1994 (central and northern Namibia)

Gallery

See also
 List of butterflies of India
 List of butterflies of India (Pieridae)

References

amata
Butterflies of Asia
Butterflies described in 1775
Taxa named by Johan Christian Fabricius